Paluel is a commune in the Seine-Maritime department in the Normandy region in northern France.

Geography

History
The village owes its name to the marshes (in Latin "Palus"), in the lower valley of the Durdent. 
A Roman mosaic was excavated in 1849 at a place known as the Rosy. 
A church has existed here from 988, under the jurisdiction of the abbey at Fécamp. 
The manor of Janville was given to the seigneurs of Paluel by Henri III in 1582. 
There was a leper colony here until 1695. 
The commune had 638 inhabitants in 1876. 
The United States "Lucky Strike" army camp counted 300,000 inhabitants after the offensive against Germany during 1944/45. 
In 1977, EDF, the French electricity company, built a nuclear power station, with 4 reactors of 1300MW each.

Population

Places of interest
 The nuclear power station on the coast at Conteville.
 The seventeenth-century château de Janville, with its dovecote and park.
 The two 18th-century châteaux at Bertheauville and Conteville
 The chapel of Notre-Dame at Janville, dating from the thirteenth century.
 The church of St. Pierre, dating from the twelfth century.
 The church of St. Martin, dating from the thirteenth century.
 A sixteenth-century stone cross.

See also
Paluel Nuclear Power Plant
Communes of the Seine-Maritime department

References

Communes of Seine-Maritime